The General classification in the Tour of Britain is the most prestigious classification out of the four in the Tour of Britain, the one which is won by the overall winner. Historically the leader of this competition has worn a yellow jersey, but, from the 2011 edition due to sponsorship, it became known as the IG Markets Gold Jersey. In 2017, it became a green jersey in light of sponsorship from Ovo Energy.

Rules
Like most cycling events the winner is determined by who has the fastest time over the entirety of the race. Time bonuses can be won by winning a stage, or reaching an intermediate sprint or the top of a climb first. The rider who has completed the course in the smallest time will win the Tour of Britain.

Results
The winners, runners-up and third places were:

Wins by country

Repeat winners

Sponsorship
Before the 2011 race, it was announced that the general classification would be sponsored by IG Markets, changing the race leaders jersey from the Yellow Jersey to the IG Markets Gold Jersey, in a competition jersey shake-up which changed the design of all four jerseys in the event.

References

Tour of Britain